Raymond Perrault may refer to:
 Ray Perrault (1926–2008), Canadian politician
 C. Raymond Perrault, director of the Artificial Intelligence Center at SRI International
 Raymond Edward Perrault (1949–2012), president and C.E.O. of Research Tool & Die Works, Inc.